Veľký Horeš is a village and municipality in the Trebišov District in the Košice Region of south-eastern Slovakia.

History
In historical records the village was first mentioned in 1214.

Geography
The village lies at an altitude of 106 metres and covers an area of 18.235 km².
It has a population of about 965 people.

Ethnicity
The village is about 85% Hungarian and 15% Slovak.

Facilities
The village has a public library, a gym and a football pitch. The municipality has its own birth registry.

External links

https://web.archive.org/web/20070513023228/http://www.statistics.sk/mosmis/eng/run.html

Villages and municipalities in Trebišov District
Hungarian communities in Slovakia